The 1978 United States Senate election in Idaho took place on November 7, 1978. Incumbent Republican Senator James McClure was re-elected to a second term in office, defeating little-known Democrat Dwight Jensen.

General election

Results

See also 
 1978 United States Senate elections

References 

1978
Idaho
United States Senate